Umbonium elegans is a species of sea snail, a marine gastropod mollusk in the family Trochidae, the top snails.

Description
The size of the shell varies between 7 mm and 18 mm.

Due to any number of modifications and combinations of the color patterns of Umbonium vestiarium. Henry Pilsbry was unable to separate Umbonium elegans from Umbonium vestiarium, even varietally.

Distribution
This marine species occurs in the Indo-West Pacific and off the Philippines.

References

 Springsteen, F.J. & Leobrera, F.M. (1986). Shells of the Philippines. Manila : Carfel Seashell Museum. pp. 1–377, 100 pls.

External links
 To Biodiversity Heritage Library (6 publications)
 To Encyclopedia of Life
 To USNM Invertebrate Zoology Mollusca Collection
 To World Register of Marine Species
 

elegans
Gastropods described in 1838